Kathu Solar Park is a concentrated solar power (CSP) thermal energy power plant, located near Kathu in the Northern Cape province of South Africa.

It has a capacity of 100.0 megawatts (MW), and full-load molten storage capacity of 4.5 hours.

The project shareholders, led by Engie include the Public Investment Corporation, SIOC Community Development Trust, Development Bank of Southern Africa, Investec, Lereko Metier and the Kathu Trust. The plant was constructed by the consortium formed by Acciona and SENER, acting as Engineering, Procurement and Construction (EPC) provider.

The plant began commercial operations in January 2019, and currently supplies power for an estimated 179,000 households in South Africa.

See also 

List of solar thermal power stations
List of power stations in South Africa

References

Solar thermal energy
Solar power stations in South Africa
Economy of the Northern Cape
John Taolo Gaetsewe District Municipality